Greatest Hits is Confederate Railroad's first compilation album. It was released on June 18, 1996 by Atlantic Nashville. It peaked at #60 on the US country albums chart.

Track listing

Personnel

Confederate Railroad
 Mark Dufresne – drums
 Michael Lamb – electric guitar, background vocals
 Chris McDaniel – keyboards, background vocals
 Gates Nichols – steel guitar, background vocals
 Wayne Secrest – bass guitar
 Danny Shirley – acoustic guitar, lead vocals

Additional Musicians

 Eddie Bayers – drums
 Barry Beckett – keyboards
 Bruce Bouton – steel guitar, synthesizer
 Gary Burr – background vocals
 Paul Franklin – steel guitar
 Michael Haynes – horns
 Jim Hoke – horns
 Jim Horn – horns
 Mike Lawler – acoustic guitar, synthesizer
 "Cowboy" Eddie Long – steel guitar
 Terry McMillan – percussion
 Phil Naish – keyboards, synthesizer
 Louis Dean Nunley – background vocals
 Bobby Ogdin – keyboards
 Russ Pahl – dobro
 Don Potter – acoustic guitar
 Suzy Ragsdale – background vocals
 Michael Rhodes – bass guitar
 Tom Roady – percussion
 Charles Rose – horns
 Brent Rowan – acoustic guitar, electric guitar
 Michael Severs – electric guitar
 Harry Stinson – background vocals
 Billy Joe Walker Jr. – acoustic guitar
 Dennis Wilson – background vocals
 Bob Wray – bass guitar
 Curtis Young – background vocals

Chart performance

References
 Greatest Hits at CMT.com

Confederate Railroad albums
1996 greatest hits albums
Albums produced by Barry Beckett
Atlantic Records compilation albums